Mark Neil Brown (born November 18, 1951) is an American engineer, retired colonel in the United States Air Force and former NASA astronaut. Brown spent a total of ten days in space, over two Space Shuttle missions.

Personal life
Brown was born November 18, 1951, in Valparaiso, Indiana, to Mr. and Mrs. Richard S. Brown. His recreational interests include fishing, hiking, jogging, all sports and chess. He married the former Lynne A. Anderson of River Grove, Illinois; they have two daughters: Kristin Elizabeth (born October 21, 1981) and Karin Alison (born May 18, 1986).

Education
 1969: Graduated from Valparaiso High School, Valparaiso, Indiana
 1973: Received a Bachelor of Science degree in aeronautical and astronautical engineering from Purdue University, West Lafayette, Indiana
 1980: Received a Master of Science degree in astronautical engineering from the U.S. Air Force Institute of Technology, Dayton, Ohio

Air Force experience
Following graduation from Purdue in 1973, Brown was commissioned in the U.S. Air Force and received his pilot wings at Laughlin Air Force Base, Texas, in 1974. He was then assigned to the 87th Fighter Interceptor Squadron at K.I. Sawyer Air Force Base, Michigan, where he flew both T-33 and F-106 aircraft. Brown graduated from the Squadron Officer School at Maxwell Air Force Base, Alabama, in 1975. He was transferred to the U.S. Air Force Institute of Technology at Wright-Patterson Air Force Base, Ohio, and earned his master's degree in astronautical engineering in 1980. Two years later, he graduated from the Air Command and Staff College at Maxwell Air Force Base, Alabama.

NASA career
Brown was assigned to the Lyndon B. Johnson Space Center in 1980. Assigned as an engineer in the Flight Activities Section, he participated in the development of contingency procedures for use aboard the Space Shuttle and served as an attitude and pointing officer. Brown supported STS-2, STS-3, STS-4, STS-6, STS-8 and STS-41-C in the Flight Activity Officer/Staff Support Room of the Mission Control Center.

Brown became an astronaut in June 1985 after being selected in May 1984, and qualified for assignment as a mission specialist on future Space Shuttle flight crews. In December 1985, he was assigned to the crew of STS-61-N, a Department of Defense mission which was canceled due to the Challenger disaster. During 1986 and 1987, he was an astronaut member of the solid rocket booster redesign team. In February 1988, Brown was assigned to STS-28, flying on 8 August 1989, after which he served as astronaut member on the Space Station Freedom program, which was later canceled. He next flew on STS-48 on 12 September 1991. Brown had logged over 249 hours in space after flying two missions.

On his first space flight, Brown was a mission specialist on the crew of STS-28. The orbiter Columbia was launched from Kennedy Space Center on August 8, 1989. The mission carried Department of Defense payloads and a number of secondary payloads. After 80 orbits of the Earth, this five-day mission concluded with a dry lakebed landing on Runway 17 at Edwards Air Force Base, California, on 13 August 1989.

Brown also flew on STS-48 aboard Discovery on 12 September 1991. This was a five-day mission during which the crew deployed the Upper Atmosphere Research Satellite (UARS) which is designed to provide scientists with their first complete data set on the upper atmosphere's chemistry, winds and energy inputs. The crew also conducted numerous secondary experiments ranging from growing protein crystals to studying how fluids and structures react in weightlessness. The mission was accomplished in 81 orbits of the Earth and concluded with a landing at Edwards Air Force Base on September 18, 1991.

Brown left NASA in July 1993 and retired from the U.S. Air Force to head the Space Division office of General Research Corporation in Dayton, Ohio.

Special honors
 Air Force Command Pilot
 Senior Space Badge
 Defense Superior Service Medal
 Air Force Commendation Medals (2)
 Air Force Outstanding Unit Award
 Combat Readiness Medal
 National Defense Service Medal
 Small Arms Expert Marksmanship Ribbon
 NASA Space Flight Medal
 Distinguished Graduate from Air Force ROTC
 Aerospace Defense Command "We Point With Pride" Award

References

External links

Brown's official NASA biography
Astronautix biography of Mark N. Brown
Spacefacts biography of Mark N. Brown

1951 births
Living people
1989 in spaceflight
1991 in spaceflight
Aviators from Indiana
United States Air Force astronauts
People from Valparaiso, Indiana
Businesspeople from Dayton, Ohio
Purdue University School of Aeronautics and Astronautics alumni
American aerospace engineers
Air Command and Staff College alumni
Air Force Institute of Technology alumni
United States Air Force officers
Recipients of the Defense Superior Service Medal
Engineers from Ohio
Space Shuttle program astronauts